Dragan Jevtović ; born 27 January 1960) is a politician and administrator in Serbia. He served in the National Assembly of Serbia from 1991 to 1993, originally as a member of the Serbian Renewal Movement (Srpski pokret obnove, SPO) and later with the Democratic Party (Demokratska stranka, DS). He has also served in the Kragujevac city assembly.

Early life and private career
Jevtović graduated from the University of Kragujevac Faculty of Mechanical Engineering in 1983, worked as an assistant trainee at the same institution from 1985 to 1991, and was an assistant from 1993 to 2001. In 1996, he defended his master's thesis at the faculty.

Politician
Jevtović was elected to the national assembly in the 1990 Serbian parliamentary election, winning as a SPO candidate in Kragujevac's second division. The Socialist Party of Serbia (Socijalistička partija Srbije, SPS) won a majority victory while the SPO finished a distant second, serving in opposition. Jevtović took his seat when the assembly convened in early 1991.

In 1992, Jevtović left the SPO and joined the DS. He did not seek re-election to the national assembly in the 1992 Serbian parliamentary election but instead ran for the Chamber of Citizens in the parliament of the Federal Republic of Yugoslavia in the concurrent Yugoslavian parliamentary election. He appeared in the second position on the DS's electoral list in Kragujevac; the party did not cross the electoral threshold to win any seats in the division.

Jevtović later aligned himself with Veroljub Stevanović's Together for Kragujevac alliance. He sought election to the city assembly in the 2000 Serbian local elections but was defeated by Vlatko Rajković of the Democratic Opposition of Serbia (Demokratska opozicija Srbije, DOS). He ran again in the 2004 Serbian local elections, which were held under proportional representation. Stevanović's alliance won this election; Jevtović received a mandate and served as the group's leader in the assembly.

He appeared on Stevanović's list again in the 2008 local elections but did not afterward take a seat in the new assembly. In September 2013, he was appointed as director of Kragujevac's directorate for urbanism.

Electoral record

Local (City of Kragujevac)

National Assembly of Serbia

References

1960 births
Living people
Politicians from Kragujevac
Members of the National Assembly (Serbia)
Serbian Renewal Movement politicians
Democratic Party (Serbia) politicians